The 2009 North Carolina Tar Heels football team represented the University of North Carolina at Chapel Hill as a member of Coastal Division of the Atlantic Coast Conference (ACC) during the 2009 NCAA Division I FBS football season. Led by third-year head coach Butch Davis, the Tar Heels played their home games at Kenan Memorial Stadium in Chapel Hill, North Carolina. North Carolina finished the season 8–5 overall and 4–4 in ACC play to place fourth in the Coastal Division. The Tar Heels lost to Pittsburgh in the Meineke Car Care Bowl. In 2011, North Carolina vacated all its wins from the 2008 season and 2009 seasons.

Preseason

Key losses
On January 5, 2009 starting wide-receiver Hakeem Nicks announced that he would forgo his senior year in order to enter the 2009 NFL Draft. In just three years Nicks had set 14 school records, including career receptions (181), career receiving yards (2,580), and career touchdowns (21). In his senior season, Nicks was named first-team All-Atlantic Coast Conference after catching 68 passes for 1,222 yards and 12 touchdowns. He was the only player in UNC history with more than 1,000 yards receiving in a season.

The following are some of the other key players who will no longer play for North Carolina in the 2009 season:

Offense:
 James "Cooter" Arnold (WR)
 Bryon Bishop (OG)
 Calvin Darity (OG)
 Brooks Foster (WR)
 Hakeem Nicks (WR)
 Richard Quinn (TE)
 Garrett Reynolds (OT)
 Brandon Tate (WR)

Defense:
 Trimane Goddard (S)
 Mark Paschal (LB)
 Chase Rice (LB)

Special Teams:
 Terrence Brown (P)

Key returns
For 2009, the Tar Heels are likely to return numerous starters from the previous season. The following players will maintain their playing eligibility and in all likelihood will return for the season:

Offense:
 T. J. Yates (QB), returning leader in passing touchdowns (11)
 Shaun Draughn (RB), returning leader in rushing yards (866)
 Greg Little (WR), returning leader in passing yards (146)

Defense:
 Kendric Burney (CB), returning leader in interceptions (3)
 Deunta Williams (S), returning leader in interceptions (3)
 Quan Sturdivant (LB), returning leader in total tackles (122)
 Bruce Carter (LB), returning leader in sacks (5) and tackles for loss (11)

Special Teams:
 Casey Barth (K), returning leader in field goals made (10)
 Jay Wooten (K), returning leader in kick-offs (71)

Recruiting
As of February 6, 2009, Scout.com rated North Carolina's 2009 recruiting class as 5th in the nation, Rivals.com ranked North Carolina's recruiting class as 6th, and ESPN ranked 12th. Joshua Adams (WR) and Kevin Reddick (LB) plan to enroll in January 2009 and do not count against the limit of 25 recruits per year. The other following players have offered North Carolina non-binding verbal commitments. These pledges can become binding when recruits sign their National Letters of Intent on February 4, 2009.

Coaching staff

Roster

Schedule

Game summaries

The Citadel

North Carolina had its best rushing game under coach Butch Davis with 260 total rushing yards (its most since 2004), and Shaun Draughn rushing for 118 yards, his fourth 100-yard rushing game. T. J. Yates threw two touchdown passes and threw for 114 yards.

UConn

North Carolina managed to come back by scoring 12 points against Connecticut in the fourth quarter to win the game.  North Carolina gained its final two points when Connecticut's senior tackle Dan Ryan was flagged for holding North Carolina's end Robert Quinn in the end zone, which gave North Carolina a safety, with 1:32 left in the fourth quarter.

ECU

Georgia Tech

Virginia

Georgia Southern

Florida State

Virginia Tech

Duke

Miami

Miami and North Carolina last met at Miami on September 27, 2008 in a game won by UNC 28–24. Miami is 5–7 all time versus UNC.

Boston College

The Tar Heels defeated a Boston College team that was playing for an outside shot at a trip to the ACC Championship Game. The UNC defense stifled the Eagles offense for much of the game, holding them to 0 conversions on 13 3rd down attempts.  Freshman Boston College quarterback David Shinskie threw for more yards to the Tar Heels defenders than to his own team.  His four interceptions were returned for a total of 133 yards, while his twelve completions gained only 101 yards.  Tar Heels DB Kendric Burney's interception return for a touchdown was his second in as many games. Cam Thomas added another defensive touchdown on a fumble return.  UNC's offense had four turnovers of their own (3 T. J. Yates interceptions, 1 fumble by Erik Highsmith), and struggled to move the ball for much of the game.  The UNC running attack was slowed due to a lower extremity injury to Ryan Houston who was sidelined for most of the second half.  However, he did return for a 1-yard touchdown run.  UNC's stout defense once again came up with big plays in the Tar Heel's fourth straight win.

North Carolina State

Pittsburgh–Meineke Car Care Bowl

Rankings

References

North Carolina
North Carolina Tar Heels football seasons
North Carolina Tar Heels football